Cyclin dependent kinase like 1 is a protein that in humans is encoded by the CDKL1 gene.

Function

This gene product is a member of a large family of CDC2-related serine/threonine protein kinases. It accumulates primarily in the nucleus. Two transcript variants encoding different isoforms have been found for this gene.

References

Further reading